Yarbridge is a hamlet on the Isle of Wight, England. It is at the southern tip of the parish of Brading (where the 2011 census population was listed). It has a popular pub restaurant called the Yarbridge Inn (formerly the Anglers Inn). There is also a small hotel with a swimming pool, Oaklands House. 
The bridge over the River Yar, defended by a Second World War pillbox, was constructed in the Middle Ages by Sir Theobald Russell who was killed fighting a French invasion, dying of his wounds at Knighton Gorges. Until the bridge's construction, Bembridge had been an island accessible only at low tide. The bridge also crosses the railway and is bordered by an RSPB reserve on Brading Marshes.

Brading Roman Villa and Morton Manor are close by.

References

Hamlets on the Isle of Wight
Brading
Bembridge